The Great Maratha is an Indian historical drama television series directed by Sanjay Khan and produced by Numero Uno International Limited. The drama aired on DD National. The series is based on the life of Mahadaji Shinde. The show comprised 47 episodes. The music was composed by Mohammed Zahur Khayyam.

Cast
 Bal Dhuri as Balaji Baji Rao
 Shahbaz Khan as Mahadji Scindia
 Farida Jalal as Chima Bai
 Kartika Rane as Jamuna Bai/Yamunabai
 Deepraj Rana as Jankoji Rao Scindia
 Pankaj Dheer as Sadashivrao Bhau
 Sanjay Swaraj as Vishwasrao
 Mangal Dhillon as Dattaji Rao Scindia
 Firoz Ali as Tukoji Rao Scindia
 Mukesh Khanna as Ibrahim Khan Gardi
 Rajesh Joshi as Vithal Shivdev Vinchurkar
 Gaazi Shah as Rana Khan
 Shama Deshpande as Gopikabai
 Rahul Awasthee as Madhavrao I
 Madhura Deo as Ramabai Peshwa
 Rinku Dhawan as Gangabai Sathe
 Hariom Parashar as Nana Phadnavis
 Parikshat Sahni as Malhar Rao Holkar
 Mrinal Kulkarni as Ahilyabai Holkar
 Seema Kelkar/Anju Mahendru as Harku Bai Sahib Holkar
Sanjay Mehendirata as Tukoji Rao Holkar
Bhushan Jeevan as Raghunath Rao
 Utkarsha Naik as Anandibai
 Arun Mathur as Suraj Mal
 Rishabh Shukla as Shah Alam II
 Jitendra Trehan as Imad-ul-Mulk
 Irrfan Khan as Najib ad-Dawlah also Ghulam Kadir
 Bob Christo as Ahmed Shah Abdali
 Maya Alagh as Begum Sadh-ruh-Nissa of Awadh
 Benjamin Gilani as Nawab Shuja-Ud-Daula 
 Faqir Nabi as Barkhurdar Khan
 Tom Alter as Robert Clive
 Noshirwan Jehangir as Warren Hastings
 Arun Bali as Mansoor Shah Baba / Alamgir II
Sunil Nagar as Benoit De Boigne

References

External links

Indian period television series
DD National original programming
1993 Indian television series debuts
Maratha Empire
Indian historical television series
Television series set in the 18th century
Cultural depictions of Indian monarchs